Woke Up Laughing is a 1998 album of remixes, rerecordings, and otherwise creative approaches to Robert Palmer's discography that's "inspired by a love of the world of music, 1977-1997, with many alternate versions appearing for the first time on disc," according to the CD's back cover. Gerald Seligman, the founder of EMI Hemisphere, suggested the initial idea for Woke Up Laughing, but Palmer wasn't interested in a simple compilation, preferring instead a rethink and a fresh approach. The cover photo was taken by Palmer's longtime drummer, Dony Wynn; when Palmer's son, Jim, saw it, he thought it was perfect for the album and recommended it be used.

Track listing
 Housework
 Charanga [alternate version of 1996 B-side by the Power Station]
 Woke Up Laughing 79/89 [latter portion of track (1:49-5:32) recorded in 1989]
 Aeroplane
 History
 What's It Take?
 Pride
 Chance
 Honeymoon
 Best of Both Worlds [remix]
 Monogamy [remix]
 Honey Bee
 Casting a Spell [remix]
 Between Us [remix with alternate vocal]

Released on Metro Blue, a sister label of Blue Note Records, based in New York City.

References

Robert Palmer (singer) compilation albums
1998 remix albums
1998 compilation albums